WBTN (1370 kHz) is an AM radio station in Bennington, Vermont. Established in 1953, the station is owned by Shires Media Partnership. WBTN can also be streamed online via TuneIn Radio.

WBTN is run as a community station with a full service variety radio format, including news, talk shows, music and sports.  Weekday mornings begin with two nationally syndicated news shows, America in the Morning and First Light from the Westwood One Network.  Then "The Big Voice of Southern Vermont morning show with Jessica Lillie and Chris Bates," a talk and music show, is heard.  The rest of the schedule is made up of programs hosted by local residents, offering a variety of topics, from local musicians to birds to old time records and radio shows.  WBTN is available to be heard on Google home and Alexa.

History
WBTN signed on the air on September 13, 1953.  It was originally a 500 watt daytimer, required to sign-off at sunset each day to avoid interfering with other radio stations on AM 1370.  It was owned by Catamount Broadcasters, Inc. and aired a full service middle of the road music format.  In the 1970s, the power was boosted to 1,000 watts, but the station was still required to go off the air at night.  Catamount added an FM radio station, 94.3 WHGC, on October 2, 1978.  In 1997, WHGC switched its call sign to WBTN-FM.

WBTN-AM-FM were acquired by Vermont Public Radio (VPR) in 1999 for $901,000. VPR wanted to add WBTN-FM to its statewide network to improve coverage of Southwestern Vermont.  But VPR was not interested in operating an AM station.  VPR sold 1370 WBTN to Robert Howe in 2000.

Howe donated the station to Southern Vermont College in 2002. In 2008, 1370 WBTN was purchased by Shires Media Partnership.  A few years later, the Federal Communications Commission granted WBTN permission to broadcast at night with 85 watts of power.

The station began simulcasting a mostly classic rock format at the 96.5 FM dial position in May 2021 using the tagline "We Bring the Noise", a play on the AM station's longtime call letters.

See also
List of community radio stations in the United States

References

 WBTN website
 1992 Broadcasting Yearbook, page A-358

External links
 WBTN official homepage

 

BTN (AM)
Community radio stations in the United States
Radio stations established in 1953
1953 establishments in Vermont